Julio Tamussin (29 April 1943 – 29 December 2015) was an Italian wrestler who competed in the 1972 Summer Olympics. He was a freestyle heavyweight, and ended up in eighth place.

References

1943 births
2015 deaths
Olympic wrestlers of Italy
Wrestlers at the 1972 Summer Olympics
Italian male sport wrestlers
20th-century Italian people